The Maranhão gubernatorial election was held on 5 October 2014 to elect the next governor of the state of Maranhão in Brazil. If no candidate had received more than 50% of the vote, a second-round runoff election would have been held on 26 October.  Governor Roseana was ineligible to run due to term limits.  Former Embratur President Dino, who lost to Sarney in 2010, won a landslide election against Senator Lobão Filho to become the sole Governor from one of the two Communist parties.

Candidates

Opinion Polling

Results

References

2014 Brazilian gubernatorial elections
October 2014 events in South America
2014